In Pakistan, the position of Chief Secretary is occupied by the highest-ranking civil servant in each of provinces or administrative units (excluding Islamabad Capital Territory). The Chief Secretaries are the administrative heads of their respective provinces.

Current Chief Secretaries in Pakistan

See also 
Cabinet Secretary of Pakistan
Secretary to Government of Pakistan
Principal Secretary
Advocate General
Attorney-General for Pakistan
Inspector-general of police

References 

Pakistani civil servants
Government of Pakistan